Belenois solilucis, the yellow caper white, is a butterfly in the family Pieridae. It is found in Nigeria, Cameroon, Gabon, Angola, the Central African Republic, the Democratic Republic of the Congo, Uganda, Sudan, Ethiopia, Kenya and Tanzania. The habitat consists of lowland to sub-montane forests.

The larvae feed on Capparis tomentosa, Ritchiea and Maerua species.

Subspecies
Belenois solilucis solilucis (south-eastern Nigeria, Cameroon, Gabon, northern Angola, Central African Republic, Democratic Republic of the Congo)
Belenois solilucis loveni (Aurivillius, 1921) (north-eastern Democratic Republic of the Congo, Uganda, southern Sudan, south-western Ethiopia, western Kenya, western Tanzania)

References

Seitz, A. Die Gross-Schmetterlinge der Erde 13: Die Afrikanischen Tagfalter. Plate XIII 12
Seitz, A. Die Gross-Schmetterlinge der Erde 13: Die Afrikanischen Tagfalter. Plate XIII 14
Seitz, A. Die Gross-Schmetterlinge der Erde 13: Die Afrikanischen Tagfalter. Plate XIII 15 as glucki

Butterflies described in 1874
Pierini
Butterflies of Africa
Taxa named by Arthur Gardiner Butler